Anatole Deibler (29 November 1863 - 2 February 1939) was a French executioner from Rennes. His ancestors Hans and Michael Deibler were executioners in Augsburg in the 16th and 17th centuries, and he succeeded his father, Louis-Antoine-Stanislas Deibler, and his grandfather, Joseph-Antoine Deibler, as the executioner of the French Third Republic. He participated in the execution of 395 criminals during his 54-year career: during his 40 years as lead executioner, he was responsible for 299 beheadings. In the early 20th century,  Deibler was deemed the "most hated man in France". There was more prejudice against him than American or English executioners because of a superstition that a French headsman had an evil eye that brought death or disaster to whoever caught glimpse. Diebler was in danger of being mobbed wherever he went and would often conceal his identity. At the time, his annual salary was around 6,000 francs ($1,200 in 1907 and $36,000 in 2022) while an additional 8,000 francs was paid for upkeep of the guillotine and 10 francs were paid for every day the guillotine was in operation. It is estimated Diebler's net annual income for was around 30,000 francs ($6,000 in 1907 and $180,000 in 2022).
He is considered one of the most famous French executioners. This is due to the fact that most of his executions were public and were widely reported by the media. The advent of the camera made him somewhat of a celebrity. Deibler died suddenly from a heart attack at a metro station while on his way to his 300th execution.

See also 
 Abel Pollet
 Guillotine

Sources 
 Cora Lynn Deibler: Anatole Deibler, Last Public Executioner in France. 2011.
 Geoffrey Abbott: Execution: A Guide to the Ultimate Penalty. Summersdale Publishers Ltd, 2012.
 Anatole Deibler: Carnets d'exécutions, 1885–1939,, présentés et annotés par Gérard A. Jaeger, Éditions L'Archipel, Paris 2004.
 Robert Frederick Opie: Guillotine: The Timbers of Justice. The History Press The Mill, Gloucestershire 2013.

Notes and references

External links 
 boisdejustice.com
 Letter from Paris, The New York, February 18, 1939
 Photo from 1923, criminalwisdom.tumblr.com
 Must Keep On Beheading People as Long as He Lives, The Milwaukee Sentinel, January 22, 1939

1863 births
1939 deaths
French executioners
People from Rennes